Song Dog is the first album by Jimmy Rankin, released on August 14, 2001 (see 2001 in music.

Track listing
 "Followed Her Around" – 4:02
 "Midnight Angel" – 3:59 
 "Drunk and Crucified" – 3:52 
 "Lighthouse Heart" – 4:10 
 "Wasted" – 4:21 
 "We'll Carry On" (Prelude) – 1:30 
 "This Is the Hour" – 4:11 
 "Tripper" – 4:51 
 "We'll Carry On" – 3:28 
 "You and Me" – 3:48 
 "Stoned Blue" – 4:30 
 "Captain Harmony" – 5:13

2003 albums
Jimmy Rankin albums
EMI Records albums